Vasszilvágy is 7a village in Vas County, Hungary.

References

Populated places in Vas County